Greenhouse was a bar/restaurant at 100 St Georges Terrace in Perth, Western Australia. Designed by Dutch-born florist, artist, builder and environmentalist Joost Bakker, and opened in 2009, it is a "quirky, eco-friendly restaurant" concept, which has been described as "... a breath of fresh air and a brilliant example of innovation in the restaurant sector." The head chef at Greenhouse was Matt Stone.

As a concept, Greenhouse had a mission to improve vastly on the ways restaurants are created, to have better design, better operation, and to be "completely waste free from the ground up".  Amongst other things, Greenhouse "... has its vegetable garden on the roof, grinds its own organic flour, has walls made of hay bales and boasts a zero-carbon footprint."

Both Stone and the restaurant have won a number of awards.  In 2010, Stone was named Best New Talent at the national Gourmet Traveller Awards; then was awarded Young Chef of the Year by The West Australian Good Food Guide in 2011 and 2012. The restaurant was given a one star rating, and the award for Best New Restaurant of the Year, by The West Australian Good Food Guide 2011, and retained its one star rating for 2012 and 2013, but lost that rating for 2014.

The Greenhouse concept has also appeared, in temporary, "pop-up" restaurant form, at Federation Square in Melbourne in 2008–09, at Sydney Harbour in 2011, and at the Melbourne Food and Wine Festival in 2012. Greenhouse also featured in an episode of MasterChef Australia series 5 in 2013.

The restaurant was sold to Red Rock Leisure in partnership with chef Chris Taylor around 2012.

The restaurant closed in May 2017. Managing partners of the venue claimed decreased revenue and high operation costs as contributing factors.

See also

 Australian cuisine
 Western Australian wine

References

External links

 By Joost: Greenhouse Perth – article on Joost Bakker's website describing the restaurant's construction
 Goodfood: Greenhouse by Joost – review of the Sydney "pop up" restaurant
 Qantas Travel Insider: Greenhouse, Perth – reviews of the restaurant originally published in Qantas The Australian Way
 The Australian: Green and gold – review of the restaurant by John Lethlean

2009 establishments in Australia
2017 disestablishments in Australia
Culture in Perth, Western Australia
Restaurants established in 2009
Restaurants in Perth, Western Australia